Çatal is a Turkish word meaning "fork". It may refer to:

Çatal railway station, a station in İzmir Province, Turkey
Çatalhöyük (also Çatal Hüyük/Höyük), an archaeological site in Konya Province, Turkey

Catal and Čatal
Čatal Česjma, a water spring in the Republic of Macedonia

See also

Catalan (disambiguation)